Nea Raidestos is a village and a community of the Thermi municipality. Before the 2011 local government reform it was part of the municipality of Thermi, of which it was a municipal district. The 2011 census recorded 3,869 inhabitants in the village and 4,101 inhabitants in the community. The community of Nea Raidestos covers an area of 14.65 km2.

Administrative division
The community of Nea Redestos consists of two separate settlements: 
Filothei (population 232)
Nea Raidestos (population 3,869)
The aforementioned population figures are as of 2011.

See also
 List of settlements in the Thessaloniki regional unit

References

Populated places in Thessaloniki (regional unit)